Lake Dolores may be:
Laguna Dolores the filled lake in San Francisco
 Lake Dolores Waterpark